Paralola is a genus of harvestmen belonging to the family Phalangodidae.

Species:
 Paralola buresi Kratochvil, 1951

References

Harvestmen